District 26 of the Texas Senate is a senatorial district that currently serves a portion of Bexar county in the U.S. state of Texas.

The current Senator from District 26 is Jose Menendez.

Top 5 biggest cities in district
District 26 has a population of 802,046 with 589,522 that is at voting age from the 2010 census.

Election history
Election history of District 27 from 1992.

Previous elections

2020

2016

2015

2012

2008

2004

2002

2000

1999

1996

1994

1992

District officeholders

Notes

References

26
Bexar County, Texas